East Asian cinema is cinema produced in East Asia or by people from this region. It is part of Asian cinema, which in turn is part of world cinema.

The most significant film industries that are categorized as East Asian cinema are the industries of Mainland China, Hong Kong, Japan, South Korea, and Taiwan. The term is sometimes confused with Southeast Asian cinema, as the cinematic traditions between the two Asian sub-regions have their own uniquely distinct markers that are often conflated and incorrectly referred to as such, which include the likes of Singapore, Malaysia, Indonesia, Vietnam, Thailand, and the Philippines.

Styles and genres
The scope of East Asian cinema is huge and covers a vast array of different film styles and genres, as the region's rich cinematic traditions are particularly well-known internationally for its production of the following types of genres such as:

 Martial arts films — including Hong Kong martial arts films (such as period kung fu films, chopsocky, Bruceploitation and Wuxia) and Japanese martial arts films (including ninja films)
 Hong Kong action cinema —including martial arts, stunt action, action comedy, gun fu, and girls with guns
 Jidaigeki — Japanese period films, including Samurai cinema (chanbara) and ninja films
 Horror films — including Japanese horror and Korean horror
 Anime — Japanese animation
 Drama films — including Korean drama (Korean-style telenovela and soap opera film) and Dorama (Japanese drama)
 Gangster films — including heroic bloodshed films (Hong Kong action crime films, usually centered on Chinese Triad crime organisations) and Japanese gangster films (Yakuza films and punk films)
 Japanese science fiction — including Tokusatsu (such as Kaiju monster films and superhero films), Japanese cyberpunk, and steampunk

History

1890s–1950s
Unlike the film industries in the Western world, East Asian film industries in its early days were not dominated by American distributors, and developed in relative isolation from Hollywood cinema; while Hollywood films were screened in East Asian countries, they were less popular than home-grown fare with local audiences. Thus, several distinctive genres and styles developed.

1950s: global influence
East Asian cinema has—to widely varying degrees nationally—had a global audience since at least the 1950s. At the beginning of the decade, Akira Kurosawa's Rashomon (1950) and Kenji Mizoguchi's Ugetsu (1953) both captured prizes at the Venice Film Festival and elsewhere, and by the middle of the decade Teinosuke Kinugasa's Gate of Hell (1953) and the first part of Hiroshi Inagaki's Samurai Trilogy (1954) had won Oscars. Kurosawa's Seven Samurai (1954) became a global success; Japanese cinema had burst into international consciousness.

By the end of the decade, several critics associated with French journal Cahiers du cinéma published some of the first Western studies on Japanese film; many of those critics went on to become founding members of the French nouvelle vague, which began simultaneously with the Japanese New Wave.

1960s and 1970s
By the late 60s and early 70s, Japanese cinema had begun to become seriously affected by the collapse of the studio system. As Japanese cinema slipped into a period of relative low visibility, the cinema of Hong Kong entered a dramatic renaissance of its own, largely a side effect of the development of the wuxia blending of action, history, and spiritual concerns. Several major figures emerged in Hong Kong at this time, including King Hu, whose 1966 Come Drink With Me was a key influence upon many subsequent Hong Kong cinematic developments. Shortly thereafter, the American-born Bruce Lee became a global icon.

Influence and impact
As the popularity of East Asian films has endured, it is unsurprising that members of the Western film industry would cite their influences (notably George Lucas, Robert Altman and Martin Scorsese citing Akira Kurosawa; and Jim Jarmusch and Paul Schrader's similar mentions of Yasujirō Ozu), and—on occasion—work to introduce less well-known filmmakers to Western audiences (such as the growing number of Eastern films released with the endorsement "Quentin Tarantino Presents").

Remakes: East and West
Another sign of the increasing influence of East Asian film in the West is the number of East Asian films that have been remade in Hollywood and European cinema, a tradition extending at least as far back as Western remakes of Akira Kurosawa films, such as John Sturges' 1960 The Magnificent Seven (based on Seven Samurai, 1954), and Martin Ritt's 1964 The Outrage (based on Rashomon, 1950), continuing through present-day remakes of J-Horror films like Ring (1998) and Ju-on: The Grudge (2002).

The influence also goes the other way. A number of East Asian films have also been based upon Western source material as varied as the quickie Hong Kong film remakes of Hollywood hits as well as Kurosawa's adaptations of works by William Shakespeare (The Bad Sleep Well, Throne of Blood, and Ran), Maxim Gorky (The Lower Depths), and Ed McBain (High and Low).

Prominent directors
Some of the most accomplished directors of East Asian cinema include:

China
Cai Chusheng (1906–1968) — Influential Chinese director of the 1930s and 1940s.  Best known for his film Spring River Flows East, which is frequently regarded as one of the masterpieces of Chinese cinema.
Chen Kaige (born 1952) — Fifth-Generation Chinese film director known for films such as Farewell My Concubine, The Emperor and the Assassin, and Yellow Earth (one of the first Chinese films to compete in international film festivals after the Cultural Revolution).
Jiang Wen (born 1963) — Famous Chinese actor turned director.  Best known for In the Heat of the Sun and  Devils on the Doorstep, which won the Grand Prize of the Jury at the 2000 Cannes Film Festival.
Jia Zhangke (born 1970) — One of the most prominent Sixth-Generation Chinese film directors.  His most renowned works includes the highly acclaimed Platform, Unknown Pleasures, and The World.
Fei Mu (1906–1951) — Pioneering Chinese director in the 1940s.  Best known for the film Spring in a Small Town, which is considered by many to be the best Chinese film ever made.
Lou Ye (born 1965) — Sixth-Generation film director of Purple Butterfly, Summer Palace, and Suzhou River.
Lu Chuan (born 1970) — Sixth-Generation Chinese film director.  Best known for The Missing Gun and the award-winning Kekexili: Mountain Patrol.
Tian Zhuangzhuang (born 1952) — One of the most prominent Fifth-Generation film directors. Known for films such as The Blue Kite and The Horse Thief.
Wang Xiaoshuai (born 1966) — Award-winning Sixth-Generation Chinese film director.
Wu Yonggang (1907–1982) — Chinese director of the 1930s best known for his work with the actress Ruan Lingyu, such as The Goddess.
Xie Jin (1923–2008) — Well-known Chinese director during the Cultural Revolution.  Notable works includes: The Red Detachment of Women, Two Stage Sisters.
Yuan Muzhi (1909–1978) — Chinese director best known for the film Street Angel starring actress Zhou Xuan.
Zhang Yimou (born 1950) — Fifth-Generation film director known for his sumptuous visual styles and allegorical story-tellings.  Notable films: Red Sorghum, Raise the Red Lantern, To Live, and Hero.
Zhang Yuan (born 1963) — Sixth-Generation Chinese film director best known for the film East Palace, West Palace.
Zhu Shilin (1899–1967) — Influential Chinese director of the early sound era.

Hong Kong
Jackie Chan (born 1954).
Stephen Chow (born 1962) — Director, actor and comedian, best known in the West for the films Shaolin Soccer and Kung Fu Hustle.
Ringo Lam (born 1954) — Best known for the film City on Fire starring Chow Yun-fat; has also worked with Jean-Claude Van Damme.
Tsui Hark (born 1950) — Major commercial Hong Kong director; Hark attended film school in the U.S.  Best known for Zu, the Once Upon A Time In China series, and Green Snake, among many other films.
Ann Hui (born 1947) — Hui emerged from the late 1970s Hong Kong new wave, gaining attention for Spooky Bunch and Boat People.
Sammo Hung (born 1952) — Director, actor and stuntman of Hong Kong action cinema, famed for starring, directing and choreographing Kung Fu martial arts films for over 40 years, as well as his association with fellow stars Jackie Chan and Yuen Biao and the hit US television series Martial Law.
Stanley Kwan (born 1957) — Director of Rouge, Center Stage and Lan Yu.  Kwan is notable as one of a small number of directors who have successfully blurred the boundaries between "art" and "popular" cinema.
Clara Law (born 1957) — Law was one of the key figures in the late 1970s Hong Kong new wave, well known for Autumn Moon and Temptation of a Monk.
Johnnie To (born 1955) — Internationally acclaimed director of genre films, known for All About Ah Long (1989), Fulltime Killer (2001), Election 2   (a.k.a. Triad Election  ) (2006) and Exiled (2006). He is a darling of film festivals, from Cannes Film Festival to Venice Film Festival.
Lo Wei (1918–1996).
Wong Kar-wai (born 1958) — Internationally influential director known for his expressive stylishness.  In the Mood For Love and Chungking Express are among his best-known films.
John Woo (born 1946) — One of the best known East Asian directors to Western audiences, his domestic output includes the Chow Yun-fat films The Killer and Hard Boiled and his Western movies include Mission: Impossible 2, Broken Arrow, Face/Off and Paycheck
Yuen Woo-ping (born 1945) — Director of classic kung fu films including the Drunken Master (starring Jackie Chan) and Magnificent Butcher (starring Sammo Hung). In his later years his expertise as a martial arts choreographer has been sought by Western directors and he has worked on films including The Matrix series, Crouching Tiger, Hidden Dragon and Quentin Tarantino's Kill Bill.

Japan
Kinji Fukasaku (1930–2003) — Director known for his groundbreaking yakuza films, including Battles Without Honor and Humanity (1973), as well as Battle Royale (2000).
Susumu Hani (born 1928) — Prominent independent filmmaker during the 1960s Japanese new wave, known for She and He and Nanami, First Love.  After a retreat from feature filmmaking in the 1970s, Hani subsequently gained renown as a nature documentarian.
Ishirō Honda (1911–1993) — Known primarily for his tokusatsu and kaiju monster films, particularly for bringing the first Godzilla film, Godzilla (1954) to audiences. His many other films include Mothra (1961), King Kong vs. Godzilla (1962), Mothra vs. Godzilla (1964) and Destroy All Monsters (1968).
Kon Ichikawa (1915–2008) — Influential postwar director of Tokyo Olympiad (1965), The Burmese Harp (1956), Fires On The Plain (1959)  and Conflagration (Enjo, 1959).
Tadashi Imai (1912–1991) — Imai emerged during the postwar years as a pioneering independent filmmaker, usually working outside the studio system and preferring an approach and viewpoint greatly influenced by Italian neo-realism.  Night Drum (1958) and Muddy Waters are two of his best known films.
Shōhei Imamura (1926–2006) — First Japanese director to win 2 Palme d'Or awards at the Cannes Film Festival, for The Ballad of Narayama (1983) and The Eel (1998). Other films include The Insect Woman (1963) and Black Rain (1989).
Hiroshi Inagaki (1905–1980) — Historical melodramatist and former child star best known for the Samurai Trilogy (1956–58), Rickshaw Man (1959) and Chushingura (1962).
Shunji Iwai (born 1963) — Director of Swallowtail Butterfly and All About Lily Chou-Chou.
Keisuke Kinoshita (1912–1998) — Director best known for Twenty-Four Eyes (1954) and Carmen Comes Home (1952), Japan's first color film.
Teinosuke Kinugasa (1896–1982) — Pioneering director of A Page of Madness (1926) and The Gate of Hell (1953).
Ryuhei Kitamura (born 1969) — A former director of pop music videos and television commercials, his films have a distinctly modern style and include Versus, Azumi and the most recent incarnation of the giant Kaiju reptile, Godzilla: Final Wars.
Takeshi Kitano (born 1947) — A gifted, multi-faceted artist and performer, Kitano's best-regarded directorial efforts include Sonatine and Hana-bi. Kitano is also known for his acting, in such films as Battle Royale and Taboo.
Masaki Kobayashi (1916–1996) — Director of The Human Condition trilogy (1956–61), Harakiri (1962) and Kwaidan (1964).
Hirokazu Koreeda (born 1962) — Former documentarian known internationally for the feature films Maborosi (1996), after life (1999), Distance (2001) and Nobody Knows (2004).
Akira Kurosawa (1910–1998) — Renowned director, whose classic films include Ikiru, Rashomon, Seven Samurai, Kagemusha and Ran.
Kiyoshi Kurosawa (born 1955) — Not related to the other Kurosawa, his films include Cure and the J-Horror hit, Kairo.
Takashi Miike (born 1960) — Prolific director of often bizarre and violent films. He is best known in the West for Audition, Ichi the Killer, The Happiness of the Katakuris.
Hayao Miyazaki (born 1941) — Acclaimed anime director and head of Studio Ghibli. His creations include Princess Mononoke, Spirited Away and most recently, Ponyo on the Cliff by the Sea.
Kenji Mizoguchi (1898–1956) — Important, influential director of The Life of Oharu (1952), Ugetsu Monogatari (1953), and Sansho the Bailiff (1954).
Hideo Nakata (born 1961) — Director of modern J-Horror films such as Ring and Dark Water.
Mikio Naruse (1905–1969) — Influential director of Flowing (1956) and When a Woman Ascends the Stairs (1960).  His 1935 Wife, Be Like A Rose was among the first Japanese films to gain an American theatrical release.
Kihachi Okamoto (1923–2005) — Prolific director. Best known in the West for his nihilistic samurai film "The Sword of Doom" (1966)
Nagisa Oshima (1932—2013) — A key figure in the Japanese new wave, known for Cruel Story Of Youth (1960), Night And Fog In Japan (1960), In the Realm of the Senses (1976) and Merry Christmas, Mr. Lawrence (1983).
Yasujirō Ozu (1903–1963) — Influential director of Late Spring (1949), Early Summer (1951), Tokyo Story (1953), and Good Morning (1959)
Katsuhiro Otomo (born 1954) — Manga artist and anime director responsible for Akira and Steamboy.
Kaneto Shindo (born 1912) — Director of Naked Island (1960) and Onibaba (1964).
Hiroshi Teshigahara (1927–2001) — Experimental filmmaker associated with the 60s new wave; best known for The Pitfall (1962) and Woman in the Dunes (1964).
Shirō Toyoda (1906–1977) — Satirist and dramatist best known for a 1959 adaptation of Yasunari Kawabata's Snow Country.
Sadao Yamanaka (1909–1938) — Humanity and Paper Balloons, one of very few surviving works directed by Yamanaka, who was acknowledged as an influence by both Yasujirō Ozu and Akira Kurosawa.

South Korea
Bong Joon-ho (born 1969) Director of critically acclaimed Memories of Murder (2003), Gwoemul (a.k.a. The Host, 2006), and Parasite (2019). Parasite also became the first South Korean film to receive Academy Award nominations, with Bong winning Best Picture, Best Director, and Best Original Screenplay, making Parasite the first film not in English to win Best Picture.
Choi Dong-hoon (born  1971) Director and screenwriter of Tazza: The High Rollers (2006), The Thieves (2012), and Assassination (2015), which are all some of the highest-grossing films in Korea.
Im Kwon-taek (born 1936). One of Korea's most acclaimed directors. Director of Sopyonje (1993) and Chihwaseon (2002).
Kang Je-gyu (born 1962). Director of the hit Korean film, Shiri and the war film Taegukgi (a.k.a. Brotherhood), one of the highest-grossing films in Korea.
Kim Jee-woon (born 1964). Director of The Quiet Family (1998), A Tale of Two Sisters (2003), and A Bittersweet Life (2005).
Kim Ki-duk (born 1960). Best known in the West for the hit films The Isle, Spring, Summer, Autumn, Winter... and Spring and 3-Iron.
Kim Ki-young (1919–1998). Director of The Housemaid (1960).
Na Woon-gyu (1902–1937). Korea's first star. Writer/director/actor of Arirang (1926).
Park Chan-wook (born 1963). Acclaimed director known particularly for his Vengeance trilogy - Sympathy for Mr. Vengeance (2002), Oldboy (2003) and Sympathy for Lady Vengeance (2005).
Park Kwang-su (born 1955). Director of Geu Seom e Kagoshipta (To the Starry Island) (1993) and Areumdaun Chongnyun Jeon Tae-il (A Single Spark) (1995).
Yu Hyun-mok (born 1925) Director of A Stray Bullet (1960).
Lee Chang-dong (born 1954) Director of Oasis (2002), Secret Sunshine (2007) and Poetry (2010).
Hong Sang-soo (born 1960) Director of Hahaha (2010), Right Now, Wrong Then (2015) and On the Beach at Night Alone (2017).
Na Hong-jin (born 1974) Director of The Chaser (2008), The Yellow Sea (2010) and The Wailing (2016).

Taiwan
King Hu (1931–1997).  Director of Come Drink With Me (1966), Dragon Gate Inn (1967) and A Touch of Zen (1971).
Hou Hsiao-hsien (born 1947) Director of A City of Sadness (1989).
Edward Yang (1947–2007).  Director of A Brighter Summer Day (1991) and Yi Yi (2000).
Ang Lee (born 1954). The most successful director of Taiwan in Hollywood. Lee has been nominated for nine Academy Awards, of which he has won three: Best Foreign Language Film for Crouching Tiger Hidden Dragon (2000) and Best Director for Brokeback Mountain (2005) and Life of Pi (2012), becoming the first non-white director to win the latter. Other notable works include Eat Drink Man Woman (1994), Sense and Sensibility (1995), Hulk (2003), and Lust, Caution (2007).
Tsai Ming-liang (born 1957).  Director of Vive L'Amour (1994) and What Time Is It There? (2001).
Wei Te-sheng (born 1969). Director of Cape No. 7 (2008) and Seediq Bale (2011). Cape No. 7 remains the highest grossing Taiwanese domestic film.
Justin Lin (born 1971). Taiwanese-born American film director. He is best known for his directorial work on Better Luck Tomorrow (2002), the Fast & Furious franchise from The Fast and the Furious: Tokyo Drift (2006) to Fast & Furious 6 (2013) and F9 (2021), and Star Trek Beyond (2016).
Giddens Ko (born 1978). Director of the critically acclaimed romance films You Are the Apple of My Eye (2011) and Café. Waiting. Love (2014).

Prominent actors and actresses

China
 Joan Chen
 Jet Li
 Gong Li
 Jiang Wen
 Zhang Ziyi
 Zhao Tao
 Zhao Wei

Hong Kong
 Yuen Biao
 Jackie Chan
 Stephen Chow
 Leslie Cheung
 Maggie Cheung
 Louis Fan
 Louis Koo
 Rosamund Kwan
 Andy Lau
 Tony Leung Chiu-Wai
 Tony Leung Ka-fai
 Bruce Lee
 Faye Wong
 Michelle Yeoh  (Malaysian-born of Chinese descent and active in Hong Kong)
 Chow Yun-fat
 Donnie Yen

Japan
 Tadanobu Asano
 Setsuko Hara
 Takuya Kimura
 Machiko Kyō
 Toshirō Mifune
 Tatsuya Nakadai
 Chishū Ryū
 Hiroyuki Sanada
 Ken Watanabe
 Kōji Yakusho

South Korea
 Choi Min-sik
 Lee Byung-hun
 Lee Young-ae
 Bae Doona
 Sol Kyung-gu
 Jeon Do-yeon
 Song Kang-ho
 Kim Hye-soo
 Ahn Sung-ki

Taiwan
 Chang Chen
 Wallace Huo
 Takeshi Kaneshiro
 Brigitte Lin
 Jay Chou
 Lin Chi-ling
 Shu Qi
 Ethan Juan
 Michelle Chen
 Gwei Lun-mei
 Hsu Wei-ning
 Ivy Chen
 Eddie Peng
 Mark Chao
 Janine Chang
 Hannah Quinlivan

See also
 Asian cinema
 Cinema of the world
 East Asian cultural sphere
 Korean Wave
 Middle Eastern cinema
 Nuberu bagu (The Japanese New Wave)
 South Asian cinema
 Southeast Asian cinema
 World cinema

References

Further reading
 Contemporary Asian Cinema, Anne Tereska Ciecko, editor. Berg, 2006. 
 East Asian Cinemas, Leon Hunt & Wing-Fai Leung, editors, Tauris, 2008. 
 Christopher Rea. Chinese Film Classics, 1922-1949''. Columbia University Press, 2021. .

Collections 
East Asia Film Library Collection: Center for East Asian Studies, University of Chicago

External links
 Asia Society: Film - news, reviews and interviews related to Asian Film
 Asian Cinema Search at Google Co-op